is a railway station in Aoi-ku, Shizuoka, Shizuoka Prefecture, Japan, operated by the private railway company, Shizuoka Railway (Shizutetsu).

Lines
Kasugachō Station is a  station on the Shizuoka–Shimizu Line and is 1.5 kilometers from the starting point of the line at Shin-Shizuoka Station.

Station layout
The station has a single island platform with a level crossing at one end. The station building is built on one end of the platform, and has automated ticket machines, and automated turnstiles, which accept the LuLuCa smart card ticketing system as well as the PiTaPa and ICOCA IC cards.

Platforms

Adjacent stations

|-
!colspan=5| Shizuoka Railway Company

Station History
Kasugachō Station was established on April 2, 1930.

Passenger statistics
In fiscal 2017, the station was used by an average of 852 passengers daily (boarding passengers only).

Surrounding area
Japan National Route 1
Shizuoka Gakuen School

See also
 List of railway stations in Japan

References

External links

 Shizuoka Railway official website

}

Railway stations in Shizuoka Prefecture
Railway stations in Japan opened in 1930
Railway stations in Shizuoka (city)